The 1914 World Hard Court Championships (WHCC) (French: Championnats du Monde de Tennis sur Terre Battue) was the third edition of the World Hard Court Championships tennis tournament, considered as the precursor to the French Open, and was held on the clay courts of the Stade Français at the Parc de Saint-Cloud in Paris from 29 May until 8 June 1914. It was organised by L’Union des Sociétés Française de Sports Athlétiques, and consisted of a men's singles, men's doubles, women's singles, women's doubles and mixed doubles event, with the women's doubles event part of the competition for the first time.

Finals

Men's singles

 Anthony Wilding defeated  Ludwig von Salm-Hoogstraeten, 6–0, 6–2, 6–4

Women's singles

 Suzanne Lenglen defeated  Germaine Golding, 6–2, 6–1

Men's doubles

 Max Decugis /  Maurice Germot defeated  Arthur Gore /  Algernon Kingscote, 6–1, 11–9, 6–8, 6–2

Women's doubles

 Suzanne Lenglen /  Elizabeth Ryan defeated  Blanche Amblard /  Suzanne Amblard, 6–1, 6–1

Mixed doubles

 Max Decugis /  Elizabeth Ryan defeated  Ludwig von Salm-Hoogstraeten /  Suzanne Lenglen, 6–3, 6–1

References

External links
 
 

World Hard Court Championships
World Hard Court Championships
World Hard Court Championships
May 1914 sports events
June 1914 sports events
1914 in French tennis